Weeney Bay is a bay in Botany Bay located in New South Wales, Australia.

References

Bays of New South Wales